Best Moves is the first compilation album by Chris de Burgh, released by A&M Records in 1981. It includes songs from his first five studio albums as well as new tracks, "Every Drop of Rain" and "Waiting for the Hurricane". It was the first de Burgh album to chart in the UK, entering on 12 September 1981, peaking at number 65 and staying on the chart for four weeks.

Track listing
All songs written by Chris de Burgh.

"The Traveller" – 4:09
"Every Drop of Rain" (previously unreleased) – 3:33
"In a Country Churchyard [Let Your Love Shine On]" – 3:52
"Patricia the Stripper" – 3:30
"Satin Green Shutters" – 5:02
"Spanish Train" – 5:00
"Waiting for the Hurricane" (previously unreleased) – 4:11
"Broken Wings" (live version) – 3:20
"Lonely Sky" – 3:52
"A Spaceman Came Travelling" – 5:10
"Crusader" – 8:48

Charts

Weekly charts

Year-end charts

Certifications and sales

References

External links
 The Official Chris de Burgh Website

Chris de Burgh albums
1981 greatest hits albums
A&M Records compilation albums